In group theory and geometry, a reflection group is a discrete group which is generated by a set of reflections of a finite-dimensional Euclidean space. The symmetry group of a regular polytope or of a tiling of the Euclidean space by congruent copies of a regular polytope is necessarily a reflection group. Reflection groups also include Weyl groups and crystallographic Coxeter groups. While the orthogonal group is generated by reflections (by the Cartan–Dieudonné theorem), it is a continuous group (indeed, Lie group), not a discrete group, and is generally considered separately.

Definition 

Let E be a finite-dimensional Euclidean space.  A finite reflection group is a subgroup of the general linear group of E which is generated by a set of orthogonal reflections across hyperplanes passing through the origin. An affine reflection group is a discrete subgroup of the affine group of E that is generated by a set of affine reflections of E (without the requirement that the reflection hyperplanes pass through the origin).

The corresponding notions can be defined over other fields, leading to complex reflection groups and analogues of reflection groups over a finite field.

Examples

Plane 

If the angle between two lines is an irrational multiple of pi, the group generated by reflections in these lines is infinite and non-discrete, hence, it is not a reflection group.

Space 

Finite reflection groups are the point groups Cnv, Dnh, and the symmetry groups of the five Platonic solids. Dual regular polyhedra (cube and octahedron, as well as dodecahedron and icosahedron) give rise to isomorphic symmetry groups. The classification of finite reflection groups of R3 is an instance of the ADE classification.

Relation with Coxeter groups 

A reflection group W admits a presentation of a special kind discovered and studied by H. S. M. Coxeter. The reflections in the faces of a fixed fundamental "chamber" are generators ri of W of order 2. All relations between them formally follow from the relations

 

expressing the fact that the product of the reflections ri and rj in two hyperplanes Hi and Hj meeting at an angle  is a rotation by the angle  fixing the subspace Hi ∩ Hj of codimension 2. Thus, viewed as an abstract group, every reflection group is a Coxeter group.

Finite fields 

When working over finite fields, one defines a "reflection" as a map that fixes a hyperplane (otherwise for example there would be no reflections in characteristic 2, as  so reflections are the identity). Geometrically, this amounts to including shears in a hyperplane.

Generalizations 
 
Discrete isometry groups of more general Riemannian manifolds generated by reflections have also been considered. The most important class arises from Riemannian symmetric spaces of rank 1: the n-sphere Sn, corresponding to finite reflection groups, the Euclidean space Rn, corresponding to 
affine reflection groups, and the hyperbolic space Hn, where the corresponding groups are called hyperbolic reflection groups. In two dimensions, triangle groups include reflection groups of all three kinds.

See also 

 Hyperplane arrangement
 Chevalley–Shephard–Todd theorem
 Reflection groups are related to kaleidoscopes.

References

Notes

Bibliography

Textbooks

External links